Augustus Pingree "Gus" Stager, Jr. (February 18, 1923 – July 6, 2019) was an American swimmer and swimming coach. He was the swimming coach for the 1960 U.S. Olympic team and the swimming coach at the University of Michigan for 25 years (1955–1979, 1981–1982).  His Michigan swimming teams won four NCAA national championships in 1957, 1958, 1959 and 1961.  He also led Fordson High School to Michigan state championships three consecutive years from 1952 to 1954. In total, he swam for or coached on five NCAA championship teams, three Michigan high school championship teams, and the 1960 U.S. Olympic team—all before his 35th birthday. In 1982, he was inducted into both the International Swimming Hall of Fame and the University of Michigan Athletic Hall of Honor.  He was also the coach of the U.S. swim team at the 1967 Pan American Games and the 1973  World Championship (1st place).

Early life
Stager was born in Newark, New Jersey. He served in the United States Army during World War II.

Competitive swimmer
Stager began as a leading high school swimmer at Newark Academy in Newark, New Jersey.  Competing on the U.S. Army team from the Philippines, Stager won the 400-meter free-style event at the "Pacific Army Olympics" held in Manila, Philippines in December 1945.  He enrolled at the University of Michigan after being discharged from the Army and set a freshman American record in the 200 yard free style in February 1947 with a time of 2:12.3.  He went on to become a three-time NCAA finalist, and named to the coaches' All-American team every year he swam for the Wolverines.  In 1948, he swam for the Michigan Wolverines team that won the NCAA swimming championship.

Swimming coach at Dearborn Fordson and University of Michigan
After graduating from Michigan, Stager became the swimming coach at Fordson High School in Dearborn, Michigan where he led his team to three straight Class A state championships (1952, 1953, and 1954) and one national championship.
In April 1954, he was named as Michigan's swimming coach when Matt Mann retired after 31 years.  Stager was hired by athletic director Fritz Crisler, and remained Michigan's swimming coach for 25 years until 1979.  Stager had a career record of 169-39-1 as Michigan's head coach.  Stager's Michigan swimming teams finished first or second in the Big Ten Conference 23 times.  He coached Michigan to four NCAA national championships in 1957, 1958, 1959, and 1961.  After the 1957 team won the NCAA team championship at Chapel Hill, North Carolina, an AP wirephoto of a fully clothed Stager being thrown into the pool by his Michigan team appeared in newspapers across the country.  Stager's 1959 Wolverines' team was considered one of the strongest in NCAA history, as they scored an NCAA meet record 137½ points (41 points higher than the prior meet record set by Yale in 1954) -- more than the combined total of the second, third and fourth place teams.

As coach at Michigan in the 1950s, Stager had conflict with Scottish swimmers Jack Wardrop and Bert Wardrop.  After being suspended by Stager for insubordination, the two quit the team despite having eligibility remaining.  Speaking later of the conflict, Stager said: "A foreign boy just doesn't have the team loyalty that an American boy has.  The foreign boys can't conceive, for example, that they should swim out of their stroke (a free-styler competing in the breast-stroke, for instance) so that the team will get points.  We train our boys to play for the team and not themselves from the time they step on the playground.  We do our best to instill team spirit in them from the start.  In most cases, the foreign students think it's just a lot of junk.  Most of them don't give a damn.  They're opportunists.  This doesn't go for all foreign athletes, but most of them are interested only in personal achievement. . . . I don't think there's another country in the world like the United States, where boys will sacrifice almost anything to see their team win."

In 1981, Stager came out of retirement to coach the Wolverines from 1981 to 1982, replacing Bill Farley as coach.

Swimming coach for U.S. swimming team
After leading Michigan to three straight NCAA championships, Stager was named the head coach of the U.S. Olympic swimming team in 1960, the youngest coach ever to lead the U.S. Olympic team.  In 1956, the Australian team took nine gold medals, and the Americans only two.  At the 1960 games, the Australiant team was favored again, but the US team led by Stager took nine gold medals and fifteen total medals, topping the Australians' five gold and 13 total medals.  In the 1960 games, Stager also coached Joan Spillane to the first gold medal win by a U-M woman.  Stager also coached the U.S. team to victory in the first World Championships at Belgrade in 1973.

Career coaching record

See also
 List of members of the International Swimming Hall of Fame
University of Michigan Athletic Hall of Honor
Swimming at the 1960 Summer Olympics

References

American swimming coaches
Michigan Wolverines swimming coaches
1923 births
2019 deaths
Military personnel from Newark, New Jersey
Newark Academy alumni
Sportspeople from Newark, New Jersey
Michigan Wolverines men's swimmers
United States Army personnel of World War II